Andrei Nikolayevich Klepach (born March 4, 1959) is chief economist of Vnesheconombank of Russia. He assumed this post in July 2014.

Political activity 
Prior to this Klepach was a deputy economics minister of Russia, and since 2004 the director of macroeconomic forecasting department of the Ministry of Economic Development and Trade of the Russian Federation. In that capacity, he dealt with the analysis and forecasting model inflation in the Russian economy, the financial situation of enterprises and industries, enterprises and the non-payment ratio of supply and demand money, market surveys of industrial enterprises, and study strategies for their survival and restructuring. Klepach has published about 50 scientific publications.

References 

1951 births
Living people
Russian politicians
1st class Active State Councillors of the Russian Federation